Henri Ndreka (born 27 March 1983 at Lezhë) is an Albanian football defender who finished his career at Laçi.

Club career
He previously played for FC Kryvbas Kryvyi Rih, one of 4 Albanians who played for the Ukrainian club simultaneously.

International career
He made his debut for Albania, coming on as an injury time substitute for Edvin Murati in a March 2004 friendly match against Iceland in Tirana and earned a total of 2 caps, scoring no goals. His other international was an August 2004 friendly away against Cyprus.

National team statistics

References

External links
 
 Profile - FSHF
 

1983 births
Living people
People from Lezhë
Association football central defenders
Albanian footballers
Albania international footballers
FK Partizani Tirana players
KF Vllaznia Shkodër players
FC Kryvbas Kryvyi Rih players
KF Teuta Durrës players
Besëlidhja Lezhë players
FC Kamza players
KS Burreli players
KF Laçi players
Kategoria Superiore players
Ukrainian Premier League players
Albanian expatriate footballers
Expatriate footballers in Ukraine
Albanian expatriate sportspeople in Ukraine